Pelly Bay is an Arctic waterway in Kitikmeot Region, Nunavut, Canada.

Pelly Bay may also refer to:

 Kugaaruk, a hamlet in Nunavut, Canada, formerly known as Pelly Bay, Northwest Territories
 Kugaaruk Airport, formerly Pelly Bay Townsite Airport
 Pelly Bay SRR Site, a North Warning System and former NORAD DEW Line radar station, and former airstrip

See also
 
 
 Pelly (disambiguation)
 Bay (disambiguation)